Gradit is a surname. Notable people with the surname include:

 Jonathan Gradit (born 1992), French footballer
 William Gradit (born 1982), French basketball player